Viktor Radchenko (born May 11, 1968) is a retired decathlete from Ukraine. He competed at the 1992 Summer Olympics for the Unified team.

Achievements

References
sports-reference

1968 births
Living people
Ukrainian decathletes
Athletes (track and field) at the 1992 Summer Olympics
Olympic athletes of the Unified Team
Soviet Athletics Championships winners